The Men's 1983 European Amateur Boxing Championships were held in Varna, Bulgaria from May 7 to May 15, 1983. The 25th edition of the bi-annual competition was organised by the European governing body for amateur boxing, EABA. 149 fighters from 19 European countries participated in the competition.

Medal winners

Medal count table

References

European Amateur Boxing Championships
Boxing
European Amateur Boxing Championships
International boxing competitions hosted by Bulgaria
Sport in Varna, Bulgaria
May 1983 sports events in Europe